Jhauwa Guthi (Nepali झौवा गुठ्ठी) is a village development committee in Parsa District in the Narayani Zone of southern Nepal. At the time of the 2011 Nepal census it had a population of 6,362 people living in 993 individual households. There were 3,287 males and 3,075 females at the time of census. It is a village Development Committee(VDC) having 9 wards. The name of wards are : Jhauwaguthi01, Jhauwaguthi02,  Jhauwaguthi03, Jhauwaguthi04, Jhauwaguthi05, jhauwaguthi06 and Madhwal.  .

References

Populated places in Parsa District